The Jacob Hiestand House, in Taylor County, Kentucky west of Campbellsville, Kentucky, was built from 1823 to 1825.  It is one of 12 German stone houses surviving in the state,  It was listed on the National Register of Historic Places in 1983.

The house is a one-story, three-bay central hall plan house built of coursed limestone. Construction was by "the dry construction method of clay sealed with lime mortar."

It was home of Jacob Hiestand, who was born in York County, Pennsylvania, who moved to Kentucky around 1816 and built this house in 1823.  A daughter, Araminta, and her husband Joseph H. Chandler, an attorney and state senator, were living in the house when it was hit by Morgan's Raid, the rambling 1000-mile long 1863 Civil War raid of Confederate General John Hunt Morgan into Indiana, Kentucky, Ohio and West Virginia.

The property included a separated  stone kitchen, a stone springhouse, a dug well, and a  cemetery.

The house is now a museum, the Hiestand House-Taylor County Museum.

References

Museums in Kentucky
Historic house museums in Kentucky
National Register of Historic Places in Taylor County, Kentucky
Buildings and structures completed in 1825
Houses on the National Register of Historic Places in Kentucky
Stone houses in Kentucky
1825 establishments in Kentucky
Central-passage houses
Relocated buildings and structures in Kentucky